Tayport Castle, was a Z plan castle that was located near Tayport, Fife, Scotland. The castle was demolished in the 19th century and no remains above ground are visible.

Citations

Castles in Fife
Demolished buildings and structures in Scotland
Former castles in Scotland
Tayport